The Small Green Rose Aphid, or Strawberry aphid, (Chaetosiphon tetrarhodum), also known as Chaetosiphon (Pentatrichopus) tetrarhodum, is an aphid in the superfamily Aphidoidea in the order Hemiptera. It is a true bug and sucks sap from plants.

References 

 http://animaldiversity.org/accounts/Chaetosiphon_tetrarhodum/classification/
 http://www.boldsystems.org/index.php/Taxbrowser_Taxonpage?taxid=143943
 https://web.archive.org/web/20150221192410/http://www.gbif.org/species/117196355
 http://aphid.speciesfile.org/Common/basic/Taxa.aspx?TaxonNameID=1167235
 http://www.padil.gov.au/pests-and-diseases/pest/main/143102/51439

Macrosiphini
Agricultural pest insects